Imagine is the third studio album by Dutch DJ and record producer Armin van Buuren. It was released on 18 April 2008 by Armada Music. The album entered the Dutch album chart at number one. In the US, it debuted at number 4 on the Billboard Dance/Electronic Albums chart.

The first single "Going Wrong" debuted on van Buuren's A State of Trance radio show. The single sees the collaboration of Armin van Buuren with DJ Shah and Chris Jones. On iTunes, "If You Should Go" was offered as a bonus track along with the Inpetto vs. Duderstadt version which was only up for pre-order. "In and Out of Love", which features Sharon den Adel from the band Within Temptation, became the second single from Imagine. Its video has been viewed over 189 million times on YouTube. The album also spawned three more singles: "Unforgivable" featuring Jaren, "Fine Without You", a collaboration with singer Jennifer Rene, and "Never Say Never" featuring Jacqueline Govaert.

Track listing 

Notes
 signifies a vocal producer

Charts

Weekly charts

Year-end charts

References

External links
 Imagine at Discogs

2008 albums
Armin van Buuren albums
Armada Music albums